Kandalampadu is a village in Krishna District of the Indian state of Andhra Pradesh. It is located in Kankipadu mandal of Nuzvid revenue division.

References

Villages in Krishna district